A list of films produced in South Korea in 1987:

External links
1987 in South Korea

 1980-1989 at www.koreanfilm.org

1987
South Korean
1987 in South Korea